The Bluegrass Album is the debut album by bluegrass supergroup, Bluegrass Album Band, released in 1981. It's a collection of bluegrass standards by Lester Flatt, Bill Monroe, Earl Scruggs, Ralph Stanley and others.  Ultimately, four volumes were released, recorded between 1980 and 1985.

The Bluegrass Compact Disc [Rounder CD 11502, c. 1986] is a 20-song release drawn from volumes 1-4 of The Bluegrass Album.

"Album" Track listing 
 Blue Ridge Cabin Home (Louise Certain, Gladys Stacey)
 We Can't Be Darlings Anymore (Lester Flatt, John Ray "Curly" Seckler)
 Molly And Tenbrooks (Bill Monroe)
 I Believe In You Darling (Bill Monroe)
 Model Church (Traditional)
 On My Way Back To The Old Home (Bill Monroe)
 Gonna Settle Down (Lester Flatt)  
 Toy Heart (Bill Monroe)
 Pain In My Heart (Larry Richardson, Bobby Osborne)
 Chalk Up Another One (H. Winston & Wilmer Neal)
 River Of Death (Bill Monroe)

Personnel
 Tony Rice - guitar, vocals
 J.D. Crowe - banjo, vocals
 Doyle Lawson - mandolin, vocals
 Bobby Hicks - fiddle, vocals
 Todd Philips - bass

References

1981 debut albums
Tony Rice albums
Rounder Records albums